Christopher or Chris Grant may refer to:

 Christopher Grant (cricketer) (1935–2017), English cricketer
 Christopher Grant, editor of the  video game website Polygon
 Chris Grant (footballer) (born 1972), Australian rules footballer
 Chris Grant (basketball) (born 1972), basketball executive
 Chris Grant (media executive), American media executive